Diogo Dos Santos Carvalho or simply Dioguinho  (born December 27, 1995), is a Brazilian professional footballer who plays as a midfielder for Iraq Division One club Al-Minaa.

Early life
Born in Santa Izabel, in the metropolitan region of Belém, Dioguinho started out in amateur teams and played in tournaments in other states. He has already gone through tests in Santos and Guarani, but at the time he did not succeed. Faced with this scenario, the midfielder abandoned the ball and went to work cutting chickens in a slaughterhouse for about a year and a half, then he returned to playing football for Izabelense, Ypiranga, and then Paragominas, and was part of the Amazonas team that won the 2019 Campeonato Amazonense Second Division, until he settled down to play for Castanhal.

Club career

Remo
On September 16, 2020, Dioguinho signed a contract with Remo and joined them, and the following year, 2021, he started with the team to a perfect start, scoring two goals in the first two matches.

Ferroviário (loan)
On August 8, 2021, Dioguinho joined  Ferroviário on loan until December without an option to buy.

Paysandu
On December 1, 2021, Paysandu announced the signing of Dioguinho, coming from Remo, as he was a midfielder on loan to Ferroviário. The player's contract was approved by Paysandu's football technical coordinator, Lecheva, who had known the player since they worked together at Izabelense in 2017 and Amazonas in 2019.

Al-Minaa
On December 30, 2022, Dioguinho renewed his contract with Paysandu for an additional year, but changed his mind after receiving an offer from Iraq, where in January 2023 he moved to play in the Iraq Division One, where he signed a six-month contract with Al-Minaa. In the player's first appearance with his new club, he was able to score the victory goal against Masafi Al-Wasat, as Al-Minaa won 1–0 and rose from third to second place in the ranking table.

Honours
Amazonas
Campeonato Amazonense Second Division: 2019

Remo
Campeonato Brasileiro Série C runner-up: 2020
Copa Verde runner-up: 2020

Paysandu
Campeonato Paraense runner-up: 2022
Copa Verde: 2022

References

External links
 
 Dieguinho at Ogol
 Dieguinho at Besoccer

1995 births
Living people
People from Belém
Brazilian footballers
Association football midfielders
Ypiranga Clube players
Paragominas Futebol Clube players
Amazonas Futebol Clube players
Clube do Remo players
Ferroviário Atlético Clube (CE) players
Paysandu Sport Club players
Al-Mina'a SC players
Brazilian expatriate footballers
Expatriate footballers in Iraq
Brazilian expatriate sportspeople in Iraq